A multicast address is a logical identifier for a group of hosts in a computer network that are available to process datagrams or frames intended to be multicast for a designated network service. Multicast addressing can be used in the link layer (layer 2 in the OSI model), such as Ethernet multicast, and at the internet layer (layer 3 for OSI) for Internet Protocol Version 4 (IPv4) or Version 6 (IPv6) multicast.

IPv4
IPv4 multicast addresses are defined by the most-significant bit pattern of 1110.

The address range is divided into blocks each assigned a specific purpose or behavior.

Local subnetwork
Routers must not forward these messages outside the subnet from which they originate.

Internetwork control block
This block of addresses is used for traffic that must be routed through the public Internet, such as for applications of the Network Time Protocol using .

AD-HOC block 
Addresses in three separate blocks are not individually assigned by IANA. These addresses are globally routed and are used for applications that don't fit either of the previously described purposes.

Source-specific multicast

GLOP
The allocation method is termed GLOP addressing and provides implementers a block of 255 addresses that is determined by their 16-bit autonomous system number (ASN) allocation. In a nutshell, the middle two octets of this block are formed from assigned ASNs, giving any operator assigned an ASN 256 globally unique multicast group addresses. The method is not applicable to the newer 32-bit ASNs. , superseding , envisioned the use of the range for many-to-many multicast applications. Unfortunately, with only 256 multicast addresses available to each autonomous system, GLOP is not adequate for large-scale broadcasters.

Unicast-prefix-based

Administratively scoped
Per the RFC, packets destined to administratively scoped IPv4 multicast addresses do not cross administratively defined organizational boundaries, and administratively scoped IPv4 multicast addresses are locally assigned and do not have to be globally unique.

Ethernet-specific

Notable IPv4 multicast addresses
The following table is a list of notable well-known IPv4 addresses that are reserved for IP multicasting and that are registered with the Internet Assigned Numbers Authority (IANA).

IPv6
Multicast addresses in IPv6 use the prefix . The general format of the IPv6 multicast address is described by RFC 4291:

Based on the value of the flag bits, IPv6 multicast addresses can be Unicast-Prefix-based Multicast Addresses, Source-Specific Multicast Addresses (both types introduced by RFC 3306, updated by RFC 7371), or Embedded RP IPv6 Multicast Addresses (introduced by RFC 3956, updated by RFC 7371). Each of these types of multicast addresses have their own format and follow specific rules.

Similar to a unicast address, the prefix of an IPv6 multicast address specifies its scope, however, the set of possible scopes for a multicast address is different. The 4-bit scope field (bits 12 to 15) is used to indicate where the address is valid and unique.

The service is identified in the group ID field. For example, if  refers to all Network Time Protocol (NTP) servers on the local network segment, then  refers to all NTP servers in an organization's networks. The group ID field may be further divided for special multicast address types.

Notable IPv6 multicast addresses
The following table is a list notable IPv6 multicast addresses that are registered with IANA.
To be included in some of the below multicast groups a client must send a Multicast Listener Discovery (MLD), a component of ICMPv6 suite, to join that group.  For example, to listen to  ff02::1:ff28:9c5a, a client must send a MLD report to the router, containing the multicast address, to indicate that it wants to listen to that group.

Ethernet
Ethernet frames with a value of 1 in the least-significant bit of the first octet of the destination MAC address are treated as multicast frames and are flooded to all points on the network. While frames with ones in all bits of the destination address are sometimes referred to as broadcasts, Ethernet generally does not distinguish between multicast and broadcast frames. Modern Ethernet controllers filter received packets to reduce CPU load, by looking up the hash of a multicast destination address in a table, initialized by software, which controls whether a multicast packet is dropped or fully received.

802.11
802.11 wireless networks use the same MAC addresses for multicast as Ethernet.

See also
Broadcast address
Reserved IP addresses

Notes

References

Network addressing